Shyriaieve Raion was a raion (district) in Odesa Oblast of Ukraine. Its administrative center was the urban-type settlement of Shyriaieve. The raion was abolished and its territory was merged into Berezivka Raion on 18 July 2020 as part of the administrative reform of Ukraine, which reduced the number of raions of Odesa Oblast to seven.  The last estimate of the raion population was

History
Shyriaieve was founded in the end of the 18th century as Stepanovka (Stepanivka), named after the landowner Stepan Shyriay.  The area was settled after 1792, when the lands between the Southern Bug and the Dniester were transferred to Russia according to the Iasi Peace Treaty. The area was included in Tiraspol Uyezd, which belonged to Yekaterinoslav Viceroyalty until 1795, Voznesensk Viceroyalty until 1796, Novorossiya Governorate until 1803, and Kherson Governorate until 1920. In 1834, the area was transferred to newly established Ananyiv Uyezd. In the middle of the 19th century Stepanivka was formally renamed Shiryayevo (Shyriaieve).

On 16 April 1920, Odessa Governorate split off, and Ananyiv Uyezd was moved to Odessa Governorate, where it was abolished in 1921. In 1923, uyezds in Ukrainian Soviet Socialist Republic were abolished, and the governorates were divided into okruhas.

References

Former raions of Odesa Oblast
1935 establishments in Ukraine
Ukrainian raions abolished during the 2020 administrative reform